The 1968 Polish Speedway season was the 1968 season of motorcycle speedway in Poland.

Individual

Polish Individual Speedway Championship
The 1968 Individual Speedway Polish Championship final was held on 15 September at Rybnik.

Golden Helmet
The 1968 Golden Golden Helmet organised by the Polish Motor Union (PZM) was the 1968 event for the league's leading riders.

Calendar

Final classification
Note: Result from final score was subtracted with two the weakest events.

Junior Championship
 winner - Zdzisław Dobrucki

Silver Helmet
 winner - Piotr Bruzda

Team

Team Speedway Polish Championship
The 1968 Team Speedway Polish Championship was the 21st edition of the Team Polish Championship. 

KS ROW Rybnik won the gold medal for the seventh consecutive season.
 The team included Joachim Maj, Antoni Woryna, Andrzej Wyglenda and Stanisław Tkocz.

First League

Second League

Two year tables
An additional award was given to the team that topped the league tables over a two year period.

First League 1967-1968

Second League 1967-1968

References

Poland Individual
Poland Team
Speedway
1968 in Polish speedway